Carol Bedö (born 13 December 1930) is a Romanian gymnast. He competed in eight events at the 1952 Summer Olympics.

References

External links
 

1930 births
Possibly living people
Romanian male artistic gymnasts
Olympic gymnasts of Romania
Gymnasts at the 1952 Summer Olympics
People from Aiud